Hornsby Girls' High School is a government-funded single-sex academically selective secondary day school for girls, located in Hornsby, a suburb on the Upper North Shore of Sydney, New South Wales, Australia. Founded in 1930, the school's first principal was Sarah Agnes Angus Brewster.

Academically, Hornsby Girls' is regularly ranked first in the Hornsby region in terms of Higher School Certificate (HSC) results and is repeatedly ranked as one of the top five performing schools in the state.

The school has a student exchange program with three of their languages - Japanese, French and German. Their Japanese sister school is Shukutoku Yono which is situated in Saitama, their German sister school is Graf-Rasso in Furstenfeldbruck and students from the school have visited New Caledonia a few times in recent years.

Faculties
The 13 faculties in the school are Computing Studies, English, History, Geography, Languages, Mathematics, Music, Personal Development, Health and Physical Education (PD/H/PE), Science, Social Sciences, Technology and Applied Studies (TAS), and Visual Arts.

Co-curriculum

Hornsby Girls' offers students the opportunity to participate in a number of musical groups, namely the Concert Band, Symphonic Band, Jazz Band and String Orchestra. Smaller musical outfits are other outlets, such as the flute choir and several chamber ensembles made up from those students who already play an instrument and wish to be involved in extra-curricular musical groups.

Other musical groups are the Junior and Senior Vocal Ensembles, who participate in a range of competitions, including the MacDonald's Performing Arts Competition and School Spectacular. In 2008, they also appeared in Battle of the Choirs, screened on Channel 7. In 2010, a small chamber vocal ensemble was introduced with the aim of allowing some students a small ensemble experience.

Notable alumnae
The Old Girls' Union was formed in 1930.

 Anne Elizabeth Boyd composer, Professor of Music at the University of Sydney (also attended Albury High School)
 Judith Ann Clingan composer, conductor, performer and music educator; Director of Wayfarers Australia (formerly Waldorf Wayfarers) Australia Wide Choir
 Christine Elizabeth DeerEmeritus Professor at the University of Technology, Sydney
 Prof. Shari Forbes creates body farms.
 Julie GoodwinMasterchef champion in 2009
 Julie Kristeen Greenhalgh (née Stapylton)Principal of Meriden School; former Deputy Principal of Pymble Ladies' College; former Head of School at Canberra Grammar School
 Ruth Hallmicrobiologist
 Robin June Parsons Emeritus Professor at the University of Technology, Sydney
 Lynette Ramsay Silver writer and historian
 Hon. Justice Sally Gordon Thomas  – Judge of the Supreme Court of the Northern Territory
 Jacki Weaver Academy Award-nominated actress, Silver Linings Playbook, Animal Kingdom, Picnic at Hanging Rock

See also

 List of government schools in New South Wales
 List of selective high schools in New South Wales

References

External links
 Hornsby Girls' High School website

Selective schools in New South Wales
Girls' schools in New South Wales
Educational institutions established in 1930
Public high schools in Sydney
1930 establishments in Australia
Hornsby, New South Wales